Deh₂nu- is a proposed Proto-Indo-European goddess of rivers based on the Vedic goddess Dānu, the Irish goddess Danu, the Welsh goddess Don and the names of the rivers Danube, Don, Dnieper, and Dniester. Mallory and Adams however note that while the lexical correspondence is probable, "there is really no evidence for a specific river goddess" in Proto-Indo-European mythology "other than the deification of the concept of ‘river’ in Indic tradition". Some have also proposed the reconstruction of a sea god named *Trih₂tōn based on the Greek god Triton and the Old Irish word trïath, meaning "sea". Mallory and Adams also reject this reconstruction as having no basis, asserting that the "lexical correspondence is only just possible and with no evidence of a cognate sea god in Irish." It is also linked to Ossetian Donbettyr who is offered “three scones with honey” for turning their waterwheels. Donnán of Eigg is considered a possible Christianized version of this deity. the deity is often seen as having fought a hero called  H2nert, with possible descendants including Nart the Nart saga, Indra, and Njord.

There’s a central Asian river called Dan which may also be related

See Also 

 Trito (Proto-Indo-European mythology)

References 

Proto-Indo-European deities
Reconstructed words
Proto-Indo-European mythology
Water deities